Epactionotus advenus is a species of catfish in the family Loricariidae. It is native to South America, where it occurs in the Biguaçu River basin in the state of Santa Catarina in Brazil. The species reaches at least 3.54 cm (1.4 inches) in standard length. It was described in 2020 as part of a review of the genus Epactionotus conducted by Maria Laura S. Delapieve, Tiago Pinto Carvalho, and Roberto E. Reis. FishBase does not yet list this species.

References 

Loricariidae
Fish described in 2020
Catfish of South America
Freshwater fish of Brazil